Sunny Ogbemudia Omoregie (born 2 January 1989) is a Nigerian footballer who plays as a forward.

Career
On 21 February 2018, Omoregie joined Alashkert on loan from Maribor for the remainder of the 2017–18 season.

References

External links
NZS profile 

1989 births
Living people
Sportspeople from Benin City
Nigerian footballers
Association football forwards
Nigerian expatriate footballers
USL League Two players
Armenian Premier League players
Slovenian PrvaLiga players
Israeli Premier League players
Maltese Premier League players
Bolivian Primera División players
Gibraltar Premier Division players
Tercera Federación players
CD Numancia B players
CD Victoria players
CD Torrevieja players
CD Binéfar players
CF Palencia footballers
Gżira United F.C. players
Thunder Bay Chill players
Mérida AD players
NK Celje players
NK Maribor players
Hapoel Kfar Saba F.C. players
FC Alashkert players
Club Always Ready players
Lincoln Red Imps F.C. players
Atlético Astorga FC players
Expatriate footballers in Spain
Expatriate footballers in Malta
Expatriate soccer players in Canada
Expatriate footballers in Slovenia
Expatriate footballers in Israel
Expatriate footballers in Armenia
Expatriate footballers in Bolivia
Expatriate footballers in Gibraltar
Nigerian expatriate sportspeople in Spain
Nigerian expatriate sportspeople in Malta
Nigerian expatriate sportspeople in Canada
Nigerian expatriate sportspeople in Slovenia
Nigerian expatriate sportspeople in Israel
Nigerian expatriate sportspeople in Armenia
Nigerian expatriate sportspeople in Bolivia
Nigerian expatriate sportspeople in Gibraltar